The Chamic languages, also known as Aceh–Chamic and Achinese–Chamic, are a group of ten languages spoken in Aceh (Sumatra, Indonesia) and in parts of Cambodia, Thailand, Vietnam and Hainan, China. The Chamic languages are a subgroup of Malayo-Sumbawan languages in the Austronesian family. The ancestor of this subfamily, proto-Chamic, is associated with the Sa Huỳnh culture, its speakers arriving in what is now Vietnam from Borneo or perhaps the Malay Peninsula.

After Acehnese, with 3.5 million, Jarai and Cham are the most widely spoken Chamic languages, with about 230,000 and 280,000 speakers respectively, in both Cambodia and Vietnam. Tsat is the most northern and least spoken, with only 3000 speakers.

History
Cham has the oldest literary history of any Austronesian language. The Dong Yen Chau inscription, written in Old Cham, dates from the late 4th century AD.

Extensive borrowing resulting from long-term contact have caused Chamic and the Bahnaric languages, a branch of the Austroasiatic family, to have many vocabulary items in common.

Classification
Graham Thurgood gives the following classification for the Chamic languages. Individual languages are marked by italics.

Acehnese
Coastal Chamic
Haroi
Cham language
Western Cham
Eastern Cham
Highlands Chamic
Rade–Jarai
Rade
Jarai
Chru–Northern
Chru
Northern Cham
Roglai
Tsat

The Proto-Chamic numerals from 7 to 9 are shared with those of the Malayic languages, providing partial evidence for a Malayo-Chamic subgrouping.

Roger Blench also proposes that there may have been at least one other Austroasiatic branch in coastal Vietnam that is now extinct, based on various Austroasiatic loanwords in modern-day Chamic languages that cannot be clearly traced to existing Austroasiatic branches.

Reconstruction

The Proto-Chamic reconstructed below is from Graham Thurgood's 1999 publication From Ancient Cham to Modern Dialects.

Consonants
The following table of Proto-Chamic presyllabic consonants are from Thurgood. There are a total of 13–14 presyllabic consonants depending on whether or not * is counted. Non-presyllabic consonants include *ʔ, *ɓ, *ɗ, *ŋ, *y, *w. Aspirated consonants are also reconstructable for Proto-Chamic.

The following consonant clusters are reconstructed for Proto-Chamic: *pl-, *bl-, *kl-, *gl-, *pr-, *tr-, *kr-, *br-, *dr-.

Vowels
There are four vowels (*-a, *-i, *-u, and *-e, or alternatively *-ə) and three diphthongs (*-ay, *-uy, *-aw).

Morphology
Reconstructed Proto-Chamic morphological components are:
 *tə-: the "inadvertent" prefix
 *mə-: common verb prefix
 *pə-: causative prefix
 *bɛʔ-: negative imperative prefix (borrowed from Austroasiatic languages)
 *-əm-: nominalizing infix
 *-ən-: instrumental infix (borrowed from Austroasiatic languages)

Pronouns
Proto-Chamic has the following personal pronouns:

Singular
  – 'I' (familiar)
  – 'I' (polite); 'slave'
  – 'I' (polite)
  – 'you; thou'
  – 'he, she; they'

Plural
  – 'we' (exclusive)
  – 'we' (inclusive)
  – 'we' (inclusive); reflexive
  – other; group (borrowed from Austroasiatic languages)

Proto-Chamic and Chamic lexical correspondences
Proto-Chamic, Mainland Chamic, Acehnese and Malay comparative table:

Notes

References
 
 

 
Malayo-Chamic languages